Roubaix Futsal is a futsal team from Roubaix, France, played in the Championnat de France de Futsal.

Palmares 
1 Challenge National de Futsal: 2007/08
3 Coupe Nationale de Futsal: 2005, 2006, 2008

External links
Official Site

Futsal clubs in France
Sport in Nord (French department)
Sport in Roubaix
Futsal clubs established in 2003
2003 establishments in France